Eccles is a town in the City of Salford Metropolitan Borough, Greater Manchester, England.  The town, which includes the area of Patricroft, contains 25 listed buildings that are recorded in the National Heritage List for England.  Of these, one is listed at Grade I, the highest of the three grades, three are at Grade II*, the middle grade, and the others are at Grade II, the lowest grade.

Eccles is an ancient settlement, and it grew in size during the 19th century with the development of the textile industry in the town.  The oldest listed building is a church, and apart from a 17th-century house and a sundial, the others date from the 19th and 20th centuries.  The later listed buildings include houses, churches, public houses, a hotel, a library, an aqueduct portal, and a war memorial.  Barton aerodrome developed in the 1930s, and two surviving structures from this are listed.

Key

Buildings

See also

References

Citations

Sources

Lists of listed buildings in Greater Manchester
Buildings and structures in the City of Salford
Listed